The Shamrock Rovers Hoops were an Irish basketball team based in Tallaght, Dublin. Rovers competed in the Superleague and played their home games at the National Basketball Arena. They were affiliated with Shamrock Rovers F.C., who were nicknamed The Hoops.

Originally known as Denny Notre Dame, the team won four consecutive National Cup titles between 1997 and 2000. Notre Dame also won the Irish National Championship in 2000. The team became known as Shamrock Rovers Hoops in 2004 and competed in the Superleague until 2010 when they withdrew from the 2010–11 season due to financial constraints.

See also
 Basketball Ireland
 Shamrock Rovers F.C.

References

External links
 Shamrock Rovers Hoops on Facebook

Former Super League (Ireland) teams
Basketball in South Dublin (county)
Shamrock Rovers F.C.
1995 establishments in Ireland
2010 disestablishments in Ireland